Sir Alfred William Flux  (8 April 1867 – 16 July 1942) was a British economist and statistician.

Flux was born in the Landport district of Portsmouth in 1867, the son of a cement maker. He attended Portsmouth Grammar School then studied mathematics at St John's College, Cambridge, where he was a Senior Wrangler in 1887 (sharing the honour in a tie with three others). While at Cambridge he became friends with Alfred Marshall, who interested him in economics. He was a foundation member of the Economic Society (1890). In 1893 he was appointed as Cobden Lecturer in Political Economy at Owens College, Manchester and from then until 1908 taught economics, at Manchester and then at McGill University, Montreal. In 1897, while in Manchester he married Harriet Emily Hansen, a Danish woman. He served as secretary of the Manchester Literary and Philosophical Society in 1900–1901.

Flux returned to London in 1908 to take up a post as advisor to the Commercial, Labour and Statistics Department. In 1918, he was appointed Head of the Statistics Department of the Board of Trade.
The Royal Statistical Society awarded him the Guy Medal in Silver in 1921 and in Gold in 1930. He also served as President of the Society between 1928 and 1930.

Flux retired to Denmark in 1932 and was knighted in 1934. He died of pneumonia in 1942, aged 75.

References

External links

Further reading
Clay, Henry; Whitaker, John K. (2004) "Flux, Sir Alfred William (1867–1942)", Oxford Dictionary of National Biography, Oxford University Press. 

1867 births
1942 deaths
Senior Wranglers
Alumni of St John's College, Cambridge
British statisticians
Companions of the Order of the Bath
Presidents of the Royal Statistical Society
Scientists from Portsmouth
Knights Bachelor
People educated at The Portsmouth Grammar School
Manchester Literary and Philosophical Society